Malli Modalaindi is a 2022 Indian Telugu Language romantic comedy film directed by T. G. Keerthi Kumar and produced by K. Rajasekhar Reddy. The film stars Sumanth and Naina Ganguly in the lead roles. It was edited by Pradeep E Ragav and the soundtrack was composed by Anup Rubens. 

It released directly in ZEE5, on 11 February 2022, to negative reviews from the critics.

Plot 
Vikram, a self-centred man and chef by profession, has a troublesome marriage with Nisha. He was unable to give time to his wife and cannot bear the torture any longer. Nisha asks for a divorce and is supported by Vikram. After the divorce, Vikram gets attracted to Pavithra, who is Nisha's lawyer. He enrolls the services of Pavithra's new company, Reset, a matrimonial platform for divorcees. Vikram and Pavithra spend time together, slowly falling in love with each other. Pavithra introduces Vikram to her parents, hoping to get married to him.
But Vikram faints at that moment and is rushed to the hospital. 

Vikram still thinks that he is not ready for another marriage, yet. He remembers his marital problems with Nisha, and shares them with Pavithra. Pavithra assures him that she will not rush things with him, and will only get married, when he feels ready. Later, Nisha tells Vikram that she is getting married soon. Vikram attends her engagement. Vaishnavi, Vikram's friend, kisses him during the ceremony and tells him that she wants to be with him, which is seen by Pavithra. Vikram soon realizes that Pavithra is the right person for him. However, Vaishnavi, upset with Vikram, reunites with her ex-boyfriend.

Pavithra sends a video clip to Vikram, stating that she is going through a register marriage. Vikram goes to the marriage registry to stop the wedding, however, in a hilarious turn of events, it is revealed that it was just a prank played by Pavithra to test Vikram, to know if he is ready to get married, again. After coming to a understanding between each other, the two get married at the registry and share a happy life together.

Cast  
Sumanth as Vikram
Naina Ganguly as Pavithra (voice over by Chinmayi)
Varshini Sounderajan as Nisha
Posani Krishna Murali as Mr. Kutumbarao
Pavani Reddy As Vaishnavi
Suhasini Maniratnam as Sujatha, Vikram’s mother
Prudhvi Raj
Annapurna as Vikram’s grandmother 
Vennela Kishore as Kishore
Manjula Ghattamaneni as therapist
Thagubothu Ramesh

Release 
The film was directly released on ZEE5 on 11 February 2022.

Reception 
Neeshita Nyayapati of The Times of India gave the film a rating of 2.5/5 and wrote "Malli Modalaindi had the potential to be a poignant, fun tale of a man who has an aversion to marriage but not commitment. Vikram and his squad definitely deserved better". 

123 Telugu gave the film 2.25/5 and wrote "Malli Modalindi is a boring movie with improper characterizations and poor writing. Though the concept, lead pair's performance are good, the movie goes off the track eventually and makes you bored for sure". Pinkvilla gave the film a rating of 1.5 out of 5 and wrote "This 'love after divorce' story is immature and dull". Sangeetha Devi Dundoo of The Hindu stated "A well-intentioned drama that could have benefitted with some zing in writing".

References

External links 
Malli Modalaindi at ZEE5

2022 romantic comedy-drama films
Indian romantic comedy-drama films
2020s Telugu-language films